Drums of Tahiti is a 1954 American south seas adventure film directed by William Castle and starring Dennis O'Keefe, Patricia Medina and Francis L. Sullivan. Drums of Tahiti was released in 3-D, and was one of three 3-D movies made by director William Castle. The film's sets were designed by the art director Paul Palmentola.

Plot
In 1877, Tahitians under the rule of aging Queen Pomare (Frances Brandt) dislike their position as a French protectorate and quietly plan a new war with assistance from Britain.

Cast
 Dennis O'Keefe as Mike Macklin
 Patricia Medina as Wanda Spence
 Francis L. Sullivan as Commissioner Pierre Duvois
 George Keymas as Angelo
 Sylvia Lewis as Mawaii
 Cicely Browne as Gay Knight
 Raymond Lawrence as Shoreham
 Frances Brandt as Queen Pomare (uncredited)
 Eddie Foster as Tommy (uncredited)
 Nelson Leigh as Minister (uncredited)
 Paul Newlan as Captain (uncredited)

Production
Filming started 15 June 1953.

References

External links
 
 
 

1954 films
1954 adventure films
American adventure films
Films directed by William Castle
1954 3D films
Columbia Pictures films
Films set in Tahiti
American 3D films
Films set in the 1870s
1950s historical drama films
American historical drama films
1954 drama films
1950s English-language films
1950s American films